Quotient algebra may refer to:
 Specifically, quotient associative algebra in ring theory
         or quotient Lie algebra
 Quotient (universal algebra) in the most general mathematical setting